Malpur is one of the oldest villages in Islamabad located off the Murree Road.

See also 

 Developments in Islamabad
 Islamabad Model Villages
 Lake View Lanes, Islamabad
 Bani Gala, Islamabad
 Rawal lake

References

External links 

 Capital Development Authority

Villages in Islamabad Capital Territory